Pyrolycus is a small genus of marine ray-finned fishes belonging to the family Zoarcidae, the eelpouts. Its three species are found in the Pacific Ocean.

Species
Pyrolycus contains 3 species:

References

Lycodinae
Ray-finned fish genera